Sam Little may refer to:

 Sam Little (basketball) (born 1946), American basketball player 
 Sam Little (golfer) (born 1975), English golfer
 Samuel Little (1940–2020) convicted American serial killer